Mildred Pomeranz Allen (November 7, 1907 – September 23, 1961) was an American politician. A Republican from Hartford, Connecticut, she was the first Jewish woman elected as Secretary of the State of Connecticut (1955–1959).

Personal life
Mildred Pomeranz was born and raised in Hartford, the daughter of Morris and Anna (Landsberg) Pomeranz.  Her mother emigrated from Russia before 1900. Mildred had two brothers.

On November 7, 1935 Pomeranz married Edward N. Allen (1891–1972), who was to take over as president of the family Sage-Allen department store in 1941 after his mother's death. They had two children, Normand Francis Allen II (1935–present) and Mary.

Music
Mildred played and taught piano as a young woman; she was a student of R. Augustus Lawson, an African-American concert pianist who became a dean at the Hartt College of Music. As late as 1950 she appeared as a pianist with an ensemble from the Hartford Symphony Orchestra. She was also active in various Hartford-area musical organizations.

Politics
Mildred Allen's husband Edward was the mayor of Hartford from 1947 to 1948 and served as Lieutenant Governor of Connecticut from 1951 to 1955. Mildred, who had been active in civic organizations and Republican women's groups, ran for Secretary of State in 1954 and won by 14,309 votes—the largest margin of any state-level official in that year.

She was also a delegate to the 1956 Republican National Convention from Connecticut.

Awards and legacy
Allen received a distinguished citizen award from the Order Sons of Italy in America in 1958 and an honorary doctorate of laws from the University of Hartford in 1960.

Mildred and Edward Allen were among the "Founders" of the University of Hartford (and Edward served as a trustee); the university was created by the merger of Hillyer College, the Hartford Art School, and The Hartt School in 1957. After Mildred's death more than $40,000 was raised in her memory for the Hartt music library and in 1963 it was dedicated as the Mildred P. Allen Memorial Library.

References

|-

1907 births
1961 deaths
People from Hartford, Connecticut
Secretaries of the State of Connecticut
20th-century American women politicians
Jewish American people in Connecticut politics
20th-century American politicians
20th-century American Jews